This article lists events that occurred during 1975 in Estonia.

Incumbents

Events
Population: 299,000.

Births
22 June – Urmas Reinsalu, politician
12 July – Kristen Michal, politician
10 November – Markko Märtin, rally driver
5 December – Kaimo Kuusk, diplomat and foreign intelligence officer

Deaths

References

 
1970s in Estonia
Estonia
Estonia
Years of the 20th century in Estonia